The Athenian School is a selective college preparatory and boarding school located in Danville, California, United States. Athenian educates students in grades 6–12 on an approximately  campus at the base of Mt. Diablo, located in the San Francisco Bay Area in Northern California. Athenian was founded by Dyke Brown in 1965.

Athenian is composed of roughly 170 students in the middle school (grades 6–8) and 360 students in the high school (9–12), which is also known as the upper school. Approximately 60 students and 18 teachers live on campus full-time. The average class size is 14.

According to Niche, Athenian is ranked 147th on the 2020 list of Best Private High Schools in America and the number one school in Contra Costa County. Athenian is also ranked as the 40th best boarding school in the United States.

Athenian holds an average SAT score of 1385 (out of 1600) and an average ACT score of 32. According to Boarding School Review, this gives Athenian the 8th highest SAT score of any boarding school in the United States.

History 
Dyke Brown conceived of the idea of a mission-driven boarding school during his tenure as Vice President of the Ford Foundation, influenced by his foundation work in youth development and the prevention of juvenile delinquency, and by his own children's educational experiences.

Athenian is a founding member of Round Square, an international organization of schools whose philosophy is influenced by the German educator Kurt Hahn. As of 2021, there are approximately 200 Round Square member schools worldwide.

In 1962, Brown left the Ford Foundation to begin to raise money for the school he had in mind. Inspired by the Oxford system of individual colleges sharing common resources, his original plan was a series of four campuses sharing a library, science classrooms, athletic facilities, a performing-arts complex, and other facilities. He found 80+ acres of land in what was then rural Contra Costa county, a portion of what was then the Blackhawk Ranch, bordering on Mount Diablo State Park.

Construction began in 1963, and the founding head, W. Robert Usellis, began recruiting the pioneer classes in the fall of 1964. Brown's vision was startling at the time: he planned for both integration and coeducation. In the early 1960s, very few private schools were recruiting students of color. The value of integration for private schools was seen by a very few visionaries, including the founders of A Better Chance. The norm for boarding schools at the time was single-sex; a coeducational boarding program was unusual. In September 1965, the school opened with approximately sixty students, in ninth and tenth grades. In 1968, the founding class graduated, with a full enrollment of about 120 students, of whom only about six were day students.

In the 1970s, Athenian weathered local, national, and international changes. The surrounding area was transformed from cattle ranches to upscale developments. Athenian's neighbor, Blackhawk Ranch, was sold to land developer Ken Behring, and by 1979 2,500 upscale homes were built. The population boom in the area meant that there was an increased demand for day student places at the school.

Nationally, at least two forces were at work. First, the stagflation of the 1970s meant that parents had less discretionary income, thus weakening the pool of prospective boarding students. Other demographic changes, such as the increase in divorce, affected the pool of prospective boarding students.

In 1979, there was sufficient interest in the surrounding community for Athenian to open a day-school-only middle school, serving students in grades 6–8. Most of them continued on to finish high school at Athenian.

Athletics 

Athenian is one of ten schools in the Bay Counties League - East. The school colors are terra cotta and earth; the sports teams wear orange and black. The full list of sports offered includes wrestling, soccer, volleyball, flag football, ultimate frisbee, tennis, dance, golf, swimming, track & field, cross country, sailing, basketball, baseball, badminton, women's lacrosse and a variety of other non-team athletics, including hiking, fencing, yoga, outdoor adventure, and weight training.

Athenian Wilderness Experience (AWE) 
While Athenian's founder, Dyke Brown, was influenced by Kurt Hahn, a wilderness expedition was not originally required in the curriculum. In the summer of 1968, two female members of the class of 1969 participated in the only program available for girls in the Boundary Waters Park. Upon their return to school, they impressed upon Brown and other school leaders the importance of having such an experience by part of the Athenian education. The addition of the Athenian Wilderness Experience as a required part of the curriculum further emphasized Athenian's experiential approach to education.

Originally, Athenian students went on courses provided by the Sierra arm of Outward Bound. After several years, the school devised its own program and hired staff, and made participation in AWE a graduation requirement. Now, Athenian students in their junior year spend twenty six days backpacking in either the Sierra Nevada (during the summer) or Death Valley (during the spring). The course is designed to promote personal growth, develop a sense of community, and foster environmental stewardship amongst Athenian students. On the homecoming day, AWE participants take part in a tradition known as "Run In", during which students run from a location that is 8 miles away from the school back to the campus.

Clubs
Student activity clubs include Robotics, Asian Club, Outdoor Adventure Club, Interweave (Gay-Straight Alliance), Jew Crew, Black Student Union, Christian Club, Interfaith Dialogue Club, Philanthropy Club, Hip Hop Club, Tea Club, Entrepreneurship, Round Square Club, and more.

Robotics 
The Athenian Robotics Collective (ARC) competes regularly in the FIRST Robotics Competition. In 2019, Athenian hosted their first FIRST LEGO League (FLL) tournament with the help of the ARC. The Athenian Middle school had three FLL teams of their own in 2019, all three of which competed in the FLL tournament.

Heads of School 
1966–1968: W. Robert Usellis
1969–1970: John Streetz
1970–1977: David Murray
1977–1987: Steven Davenport
1987–1992: Sam Eliot
1992–2009: Eleanor Dase
2009–present: Eric Niles

References

External links
 

Bay Counties League East
Educational institutions established in 1965
Round Square schools
High schools in Contra Costa County, California
Private preparatory schools in California
Private high schools in California
Preparatory schools in California
1965 establishments in California
Danville, California